A fire brick, firebrick, or refractory is a block of ceramic material used in lining furnaces, kilns, fireboxes, and fireplaces.  A refractory brick is built primarily to withstand high temperature, but will also usually have a low thermal conductivity for greater energy efficiency. Usually dense firebricks are used in applications with extreme mechanical, chemical, or thermal stresses, such as the inside of a wood-fired kiln or a furnace, which is subject to abrasion from wood, fluxing from ash or slag, and high temperatures. In other, less harsh situations, such as in an electric- or natural gas-fired kiln, more porous bricks, commonly known as "kiln bricks", are a better choice. They are weaker, but they are much lighter and easier to form and insulate far better than dense bricks. In any case, firebricks should not spall, and their strength should hold up well during rapid temperature changes.

Manufacture
In the making of firebrick, fireclay is fired in the kiln until it is partly vitrified. For special purposes, the brick may also be glazed. Also available are firebrick "splits" which are half the thickness and are often used to line wood stoves and fireplace inserts. The dimensions of a split are usually . Fire brick was first invented in 1822 by William Weston Young in the Neath Valley of Wales.

High temperature applications
High-temperature Reusable Surface Insulation (HRSI), a material with the same composition, was used in the insulating tiles of the Space Shuttle.

Non-ferrous metallurgical processes use basic refractory bricks because the slags used in these processes readily dissolve the "acidic" silica bricks. The most common basic refractory bricks used in smelting non-ferrous metal concentrates are "chrome-magnesite" or "magnesite-chrome" bricks (depending on the relative ratios of magnesite and chromite ores used in their manufacture).

Lower temperature applications
A range of other materials find use as firebricks for lower temperature applications. Magnesium oxide is often used as a lining for furnaces.  Silica bricks are the most common type of bricks used for the inner lining of furnaces and incinerators. As the inner lining is usually of sacrificial nature, fire bricks of higher alumina content may be employed to lengthen the duration between re-linings. Very often cracks can be seen in this sacrificial inner lining shortly after being put into operation. They revealed more expansion joints should have been put in the first place, but these now become expansion joints themselves and are of no concern as long as structural integrity is not affected. Silicon carbide, with high abrasive strength, is a popular material for hearths of incinerators and cremators. Common red clay brick may be used for chimneys and wood-fired ovens.

See also
 Harbison-Walker Refractories Company
 Equivalent VIII
 Niles Firebrick

References

Further reading 
 

Bricks
Refractory materials
Silicates